Megachile piliventris is a species of bee in the family Megachilidae. It was described by Morawitz in 1886.

References

Piliventris
Insects described in 1886